Water Music is a 1717 composition by George Frideric Handel. It may also refer to:

Water Music (Telemann) (Hamburger Ebb und Fluth), 1723 orchestral suite by Georg Philipp Telemann
Water Music, 1952 performance piece by John Cage
Water Music (novel), 1982 novel by T. C. Boyle
Water Music (Ryerson book), 2003 photography book by Marjorie Ryerson
Water Music, Echo-prize winning album by Capella de la Torre 2016